Jay is a common given name, and a nickname for many names beginning with 'J'. In Hindu-influenced cultures, Jay or Jai is a common first name for a male, derived from the Sanskrit for "win" or "victory."

Sports
Jay Abdo (born 1962), Syrian actor
Jay Adams (1961–2014), American skateboarder
Jay Ajayi (born 1993), English American NFL football player
Jay Barnett (born 2001), Australian association football player
Jay Beagle (born 1985), Canadian ice hockey player
Jay Berger (born 1966), American tennis player
Jay Bothroyd (born 1982), English football player
Jay Bouwmeester (born 1983), Canadian hockey player
Jay Briscoe (1984–2023), American professional wrestler 
Jay Bruce (born 1987), Major League Baseball player, three-time All-Star
Jay Cutler (American football) (born 1983), American football player
Jay Cutler (bodybuilder) (born 1971), American bodybuilder
Jay Dahlgren (born 1948), Canadian javelin thrower
Jay DeMerit (born 1979), American soccer player
Jay Emmanuel-Thomas (born 1990), English footballer 
Jay Faatz (1860–1923), American baseball player 
Jay Fiedler (born 1971), American NFL football quarterback
Jay Haas (born 1953), American golfer
Jay Idzes (born 2000), Dutch footballer 
Jay Jones (born 1974), American football player
Jay Lethal (born 1985), American professional wrestler
Jay McDonagh (born 1973), American football player
Jay McKee (born 1977), Canadian ice hockey player
Jay Moriarity (1978–2001), American big wave surfer
Jay Novacek (born 1962), American football player
Jay-Jay Okocha (born 1973), Nigerian footballer
Jay O'Shea (born 1988), Irish footballer 
Jay Scrubb (born 2000), American basketball player
Jay Tufele (born 1999), American football player
Jay Wheeldon (born 1989), English footballer

Music
Jay Aston (born 1961), English singer
Jay Azzolina (born 1952), American guitarist 
Jay Bennett (1963–2009), American musician
Jay Bentley (born 1964), American musician
Jay Chou (born 1979), Taiwanese musician
Jay Cloidt (born 1949), American composer and audio engineer 
Jay Dee Daugherty (born 1952), American drummer
Jay Ferguson (American musician) (born 1947)
Jay Ferguson (Canadian musician) (born 1968)
Jay Greenberg (composer) (born 1991), American composer
Jay Greenberg (psychoanalyst) (born 1942), American psychoanalyst and psychologist
 James "Jay" Huguely (1940–2008), American actor, recording artist known as Cledus Maggard & the Citizen's Band
Jay Kay (born 1969), British musician and frontman of British band Jamiroquai
Jay Lane (born 1964), American musician
Jay Livingston (1915–2001), American composer
Jay Osmond (born 1955), American musician
Jay Park (born 1987), Korean American b-boy and singer (Ex-2PM member)
Jay Park (born 2002), Korean American singer, member of the group ENHYPEN
Jay Reatard (1980–2010), American musician 
Jay Sean (born 1979), British musician
 John Jay Traynor (1943–2014), American singer, member of the group Jay and the Americans
Jay Weinberg (born 1990), American drummer
Jay Wilbur (1898–1970), British bandleader
Jay Yim (born 1958), American composer 
Jay Yuenger (born 1966), American guitarist 
Jay Zeffin, English musician, composer
Jay Ziskrout (born 1962), American drummer

Television and film
Jay Abdo (born 1962), Syrian actor 
Jay Baruchel (born 1982), Canadian actor
Jay Bhanushali (born 1984), Indian actor 
Jay Brazeau (born 1953), Canadian actor 
Jay Chandrasekhar (born 1968), American director
Jay Faerber (born 1972), American comic and television writer 
Jay R. Ferguson (born 1974), American actor
Jay Harrington (born 1971), American actor
Jay Hayden (born 1987), American actor 
Jay Hernandez (born 1978), American actor
Jay Ilagan (1953–1992), Filipino actor 
Jay Karnes (born 1963), American actor
Jay Laga'aia (born 1963), New Zealand actor
Jay Leno (born 1950), American comedian and talk-show host
Jay McCarroll (born 1974), American fashion designer
Jay Mohr (born 1970), American actor
Jay North (born 1951), American actor
Jay Odjick, Algonquin artist, writer, and television producer 
Jay Purvis (born 1976), Canadian carpenter and television presenter
Jay Roach (born 1957), American director
Jay Ryan (actor) (born 1981), New Zealand actor
Jay Silverheels (1912–1980), Canadian actor
Jay Thomas (1948–2017), American actor and talk-show host
Jay Underwood (born 1968), American actor and pastor
Jay Wolpert, American television producer and screenwriter

Other professions
Jay Adair (born 1969/1970), American businessman, CEO of Copart
Jay Armes (born 1932), American amputee, actor, and private investigator 
Jay Bhattacharya (born 1968), Indian professor 
Jay Boersma (born 1947), American fine art and documentary photographer 
Jay Bybee (born 1953), American judge
Jay Chaudhry (born 1958/1959), American billionaire, CEO and founder of Zscaler
Jay Chevalier (1936–2019), American singer and songwriter
Jay Chiat (1931–2002), American advertising designer
Jay Cooke (1821–1905), American financier
Jay Fox (1870–1961), American journalist, trade unionist, and political activist
Jay Garner (born 1938), American retired US Army lieutenant general and business executive
Jay Gillenwater (born 1933), American professor
Jay Gould (1836–1892), American financier
Jay Gunter (1911–1994), American pathologist and amateur astronomer
Jay Hammond (1922–2005), American politician and state governor
Jay Inslee (born 1951), American politician
Jay Jalisi (born 1965), American politician 
Jay Jasanoff (born 1942), American linguist
Jay Kordich (1923–2017), American author and juice fasting advocate 
Jay McCallum (born 1960), justice of the Louisiana Supreme Court
Jay McInerney (born 1955), American writer
Jay Miner (1932–1994), American computer pioneer
Jay Monahan (born 1971), PGA Tour commissioner
Jay Nixon (born 1956), American politician
Jay Nordlinger (born 1963), American journalist
Jay Obernolte (born 1970), American politician, businessman, and video game developer 
Jay Ohrberg, American car collector and customizer  
Jay Penske, American media entrepreneur 
Jay Pritzker (1922–1999), American businessman
Jay Raymond (born 1962), American general
Jay Rockefeller (born 1937), American politician
Jay P. Rolison Jr. (1929–2007), New York politician
Jay Rosen (born 1956), American writer
Jay Sekulow (born 1956), American lawyer
Jay Severin (1951–2020), American radio talk show host
Jay Ulfelder, American political scientist
Jay Upton (1879–1938), American politician and attorney
Jay Walljasper (1955/56–2020), American writer, editor, speaker, and community consultant
Jay Weatherill (born 1964), Australian politician 
Jay Wolfe (born 1955), American businessman and politician
Jay Wynne (born 1968), American weather forecaster
Jay Zeamer Jr. (1918–2007), American aeronautical engineer, pilot, and WWII veteran

Fictional characters
Jay, a character in the 2005 American romantic comedy movie The 40-Year-Old Virgin
Jay Cartwright, in the television series The Inbetweeners
Jay Garrick, in the DC Comics universe
Jay Gatsby, in the 1925 novel The Great Gatsby by F. Scott Fitzgerald
Jay Halstead, in the television series Chicago P.D.
Jay Hogart, in the television series Degrassi: The Next Generation
Jay Kyle, in the TV series My Wife and Kids
Jay Landsman, in the television series The Wire
Jay Nakamura, Superman (Jon Kent)'s boyfriend in DC Comics
Jay Sherman, in the animated series The Critic
Jay Walker, the ninja of lightning in the television series Ninjago
Jay, in the films of Kevin Smith
 Jay, in the television series The Tribe
 Jay, one of The Blues in Angry Birds
 Jay, "The Leader" in the animated series Clash of the Titans
Jay, in the web series Marble Hornets
 Jay, in the animated series The Ridonculous Race
 Jay, in the animated series Big Mouth
Jay, a villager in the Nintendo video game Animal Crossing

See also
Jay (surname)

English masculine given names
English feminine given names
English unisex given names
Masculine given names
Feminine given names
Unisex given names
Hypocorisms